Volleyball events were contested at the 1970 Central American and Caribbean Games in Panama City, Panama.

References
 

1970 Central American and Caribbean Games
1970
1970 in volleyball
International volleyball competitions hosted by Panama